The 1946 Penn Quakers football team was an American football team that represented the University of Pennsylvania in the Ivy League during the 1946 college football season. In its ninth season under head coach George Munger, the team compiled a 6–2 record, was ranked No. 13 in the final AP Poll, and outscored opponents by a total of 265 to 102.

The Quakers ranked third nationally in total defense, giving up an average of only 158.9 yards per game. They also ranked fourth in scoring offense (33.1 points per game), 10th nationally in total offense (340.0 yards per game), and ninth in rushing offense (233.1 rushing yards per game).

Four Penn players received honors from the Associated Press (AP)  or International News Service (INS) on the 1946 All-Eastern football team: center Chuck Bednarik (AP-1, INS-1); tackle B. Gallagher (AP-1); guard Robert Rutkowski; and halfback Maderak (INS-2).

Chuck Bednarik and George Munger were inducted into the College Football Hall of Fame in 1969 and 1976, respectively.

The team played its home games at Franklin Field in Philadelphia.

Schedule

After the season

The 1947 NFL Draft was held on December 16, 1946. The following Quakers were selected.

References

Penn
Penn Quakers football seasons
Penn Quakers football